Henry Mills Alden (November 11, 1836 – October 7, 1919) was an American author and editor of Harper's Magazine for fifty years—from 1869 until 1919.

Early years
He was born on November 11, 1836, in Mount Tabor near Danby, Vermont, eighth in descent from John Alden, the immigrant. He attended a district school, worked in a cotton factory, taught school, and in that way made his college course possible.

He graduated at Williams College in 1857 and at the Andover Theological Seminary in 1860. On the day of his graduation he delivered the master's oration at Williams college on the Hellenic type of men; he also wrote the class hymn for Andover. Though he was licensed to preach, he chose other fields of endeavor.

In the summer of 1861 he was married to Susan F. Foster of Andover, Massachusetts.

Career
He located in New York City in 1861, and was employed in teaching and in writing editorials for the daily newspapers and contributing articles to the Atlantic Monthly. He was known as a classical student of large acquirements, particularly in connection with Greek literature and thought; and his first literary ventures were two articles contributed to the Atlantic Monthly on the Eleusinian Mysteries.

From 1863 to 1869 he was managing editor of Harper's Weekly, and in 1869 was transferred to the editorial chair of Harper's Magazine. From 1863 to 1864, he lectured before the Lowell Institute, Boston, on The Structure of Paganism. His personality pervaded Harper's Magazine during his long editorial service, which was unobtrusive but distinctive. He deigned to recognize the novice and to encourage the best kind of Americanism.

He received the degree of LL.D. in 1888 from Williams College.

Last years
He married Ada Foster Murray on February 22, 1900 in Metuchen, New Jersey. His stepdaughter, Aline Murray Kilmer, was a published poet and wife of (Alfred) Joyce Kilmer, author of the famous "Trees" poem. With William Dean Howells he edited numerous collections of stories by American writers.

Alden was an early member of the American Academy of Arts and Letters. He died on October 7, 1919, at his home, 521 West 112th Street, in New York City.

Works
He collaborated with A. H. Guernsey in the preparation of Harper's Pictorial History of the Great Rebellion, and as reader of manuscript, from 1862 to 1865.

His publications include:

A poem
 The Ancient "Lady of Sorrow" (1871)

Two profound metaphysical essays (both extensively read and enthusiastically received by critics)
 God in His World: an Interpretation (1890), published anonymously.
 A Study of Death (1895)

Other works
 Magazine Writing and the New Literature (1908)
 "The Other Side of Mortality" in In After Days: Thoughts on the Future Life (1910)

As editor Harper's Novelettes, with William Dean Howells:
 Different Girls (1906)
 The Heart of Childhood (1906)
 Quaint Courtships (1906)
 Their Husband's Wives (1906)
 Under the Sunset (1906)
 Life at High Tide (1907)
 Shapes that Haunt the Dusk (1907)
 Southern Lights and Shadows (1907)

References

Citations

Sources

External links

 
 
 
 

American motivational writers
American classical scholars
1836 births
Williams College alumni
1919 deaths
People from Mount Tabor, Vermont
Harper's Weekly editors
Members of the American Academy of Arts and Letters